Løkken may refer to the following locations:

Løkken-Vrå, a former municipality in Denmark, Now part of Hjørring.
Løkken, Denmark, a small sea side town.
Løkken Verk, a village in Norway.